Mbuluzi Game Reserve is a privately owned reserve in Eswatini, within the Lubombo Conservancy. There are 3 lodges privately situated on the Mlawula River, and a campsite, situated above some rapids in the Mbuluzi River.

Wildlife
Large wildlife species present in the reserve include South African giraffes, plains zebras, black wildebeests, kudus, nyalas, bushbucks, waterbucks, impala, warthogs, crocodiles, vervet monkeys, vhacma baboons, common duikers. Also occasionally seen are hippopotami, bushpigs, Cape clawless otters, and red duikers.

References

External links
 
 

Protected areas of Eswatini